Dolichopus consanguineus is a species of long-legged fly in the family Dolichopodidae.

References

consanguineus
Articles created by Qbugbot
Insects described in 1899
Taxa named by William Morton Wheeler